Katherine Elizabeth Firth (born 24 February 1979) is a British-Australian poet and librettist. She is also a university lecturer, working at La Trobe University, Melbourne, and a research associate at Trinity College Theological School, Melbourne, the theological college of the Anglican Province of Victoria.

Education
Firth was born in Western Australia and raised in Melbourne, the Northern Territory and Hong Kong, where she completed her schooling at King George V School. She read English literature at Newnham College, Cambridge, and completed a Master's degree in Music, History and Culture at Oxford Brookes University, where she also gained her doctorate for her thesis, The MacNeices and their Circles: Poets & Composers in Collaboration 1939-54.

Career

Poet and librettist
Firth has created libretti for collaborations with award-winning Sydney composer Andrew Schultz, and Melbourne composers Michael Leighton Jones, and Peter Campbell. Her collaboration with Andrew Schultz, 'Southern Cantata', op. 102, was first performed on Advent Sunday 2017 at St John's Church Southbank, Victoria. The work was first broadcast on 3MBS Radio in February 2018.

Her collaboration with Michael Leighton Jones, 'Anthem for the Feast of any Healer' was first performed by the Choir of Trinity College, Cambridge directed by Stephen Layton. It was subsequently recorded by the Australian Broadcasting Corporation performed by the librettist and the Choir of Trinity College (University of Melbourne) under the direction of the composer.

Two collaborations with Peter Campbell, 'Sunlight touches the roses' and 'In Advent heat' were written for and recorded by the Choir of Trinity College (University of Melbourne).

Firth has reflected on the poetry of Anglican Archbishop of Canterbury Rowan Williams for the Australian Broadcasting Corporation Encounter program.

Academic and educator
Firth has collaborated with her partner Andreas Loewe on key Lutheran compositions, creating English study translations of the German libretti of Bach's St John Passion, and Martin Luther's iconic hymn "Ein feste Burg ist unser Gott" ("A Mighty Fortress Is Our God"). Both contributed a joint reflection on the word setting and music of Bach to Ida Lichter's The Secret Magic of Music: Conversations with Musical Masters.

A lecturer at La Trobe University, Firth has published widely in the field of poetry and music, including articles on modernist poets T. S. Eliot, Louis MacNeice and Ezra Pound, Australian and British women poets Judith Wright and Kathleen Raine, and composers such as Gerald Finzi.

In 2013, she received the University of Melbourne's Norman Curry Award for her work in developing Thesis Boot Camp with educators Peta Freestone and Liam Connell. Her academic skills work centres on fostering academic writing skills. Her How to fix academic writing trouble, with Inger Mewburn and Shaun Lehmann, is being published by Open University Press.

References

Living people
Alumni of Oxford Brookes University
Women librettists
1979 births
Writers from Western Australia
Academic staff of La Trobe University
Alumni of Newnham College, Cambridge
Australian women poets